William Henry Harrison Beadle (January 1, 1838 – November 15, 1915) was an American soldier, lawyer, educator and administrator.

Biography
He was born in a log cabin in Parke County, Indiana, and grew up on the frontier. Refusing his father's offer of a farm, he accepted instead $1,000 for an education. He studied civil engineering at the University of Michigan. Shortly after graduating in 1861, he enlisted in the Union Army and by the end of the war had risen to the rank of brevet brigadier general. He received his law degree from the University of Michigan in 1867 and practiced briefly.

In 1869 President Ulysses S. Grant appointed him surveyor-general of Dakota Territory. His journeys through the territory and his previous frontier experience convinced him that school lands were a trust for future generations and should be sold at their appraised value and never for less than $10 an acre ($2,500 per km2) . This effort dominated his life. He served as secretary of the 1877 commission to codify the territorial laws and as chairman of the judiciary committee in the territorial House. In 1879 he became superintendent of public instruction. Beadle drafted the school lands provision at the South Dakota constitutional convention of 1885. When Congress accepted the state constitution in 1889, it was so impressed that similar provisions were required for North Dakota, Montana, Washington, Idaho, and Wyoming. This preserved 22 million acres (89,000 km2) for schools.

Beadle served as president of the Madison State Normal School from 1889 to 1906, and as a professor of history until his retirement in 1912. He died on November 15, 1915, in San Francisco while visiting his daughter.

In 1938, the state of South Dakota donated a bronze statue of Beadle to the National Statuary Hall Collection at the United States Capitol. Replicas of this statue stand in the South Dakota State Capitol and at Dakota State University. Beadle County, South Dakota is named in his honor.

In 2013, Dakota State University named the General Beadle Honors Program after Beadle.

References

Further reading
 

1838 births
1915 deaths
People from Parke County, Indiana
University of Michigan Law School alumni
Union Army officers